James Jay Carafano (born May 8, 1955) is the director of the Douglas and Sarah Allison Center for Foreign Policy Studies and vice president of the Kathryn and Shelby Cullom Davis Institute for International Studies at The Heritage Foundation. Carafano is also an adjunct professor at the Institute of World Politics.

Early life and education
Carafano was born in New York City, and raised in East Meadow, New York. He holds an M.A. in British and early modern European history from Georgetown University, an M.A. in strategic studies from the U.S. Army War College in Carlisle, Pennsylvania and a Ph.D. in diplomatic history from Georgetown.

Career

Military and academic
Carafano served 25 years in the Army in Europe, South Korea, and the U.S., and he rose to the rank of lieutenant colonel. During that time, he served as head speech writer for the Army Chief of Staff and was the executive director of Joint Force Quarterly, the Defense Department's military journal.

Carafano has taught at Mount Saint Mary College in New York and served as a fleet professor at the U.S. Naval War College. He has been an assistant professor at the U.S. Military Academy at West Point, and, as of 2011, he serves as a visiting professor at the National Defense University at Fort Lesley McNair in Washington and at Georgetown. Carafano joined The Institute of World Politics in Washington, D.C., in 2013 as an adjunct professor. He is a member of the National Academies Board on Army Science and Technology, the Department of the Army Historical Advisory Committee, and is a senior fellow at the George Washington University Homeland Security Policy Institute. Carafano is an advisory board member of Spirit of America, a 501(c)(3) organization that supports the safety and success of Americans serving abroad and the local people and partners they seek to help.

Policy papers
Carafano co-authored the homeland security report, Homeland Security 3.0: Building a National Enterprise to Keep America Safe, Free, and Prosperous. He also co-wrote A New Strategy For Real Immigration Reform.  Writing regarding defense, Carafano's 2008 study Providing for the Common Defense: What 10 Years of Progress Would Look Like,  maps out a 10-year defense-strategy blueprint, including setting a floor on the defense budget as four percent of GDP.

Congress and media appearances
Carafano has testified before the U.S. Congress as an expert of defense, intelligence, and homeland security issues. He provided commentary for Fox News.

In 2013, Carafano co-produced a short documentary, Veteran Nation, about the experiences of veterans of the United States Armed Forces. The film was created in partnership with ColdWater Media and Esprit de Corps and screened at The Heritage Foundation in February 2013.

Carafano is a Contributing Editor to the online national security publication 1945.

Trump transition team
Politico reported that Carafano was the primary aide to the State Department for the Donald Trump administration's transition team. He organized meetings with European and Canadian diplomatic representatives "to hear out concerns about the incoming administration. Carafano insisted he was not hosting the event on behalf of the president-elect. But diplomats and congressional staffers said they understand he is likely to emerge as the Trump team's liaison for State Department matters."

Bibliography
 After D-Day (2000)
 Waltzing in to the Cold War (2002)
 Independent Task Force Report, Emergency Responders: Drastically Underfunded, Dangerously Unprepared (2003)
 Homeland Security (2005)
 Winning the Long War: Lessons from the Cold War for Defeating Terrorism and Preserving Freedom (2005)
 GI Ingenuity: Improvisation, Technology and Winning World War II (2006)
 Mismanaging Mayhem: How Washington Responds to Crisis (2008)
 Private Sector, Public Wars: Contractors in Combat—Afghanistan, Iraq, and Future Conflicts (2008) 
 Wiki at War: Conflict in a Socially Networked World (Texas A&M University Press, 2012)

References

External links

 James Carafano at the Heritage Foundation
 James Carafano at the Homeland Security Policy Institute
 James Carafano articles
 James Carafano media
 

1955 births
American military writers
Georgetown University alumni
The Heritage Foundation
Naval War College faculty
United States Army officers
United States Military Academy alumni
Living people
People from East Meadow, New York